Ixtlán de los Hervores, also known as Ixtlán, is a city in the Mexican state of Michoacán. It is  

Ixtlán de los Hervores is known for its thermal water springs. In Ixtlán de los Hervores one will find three geysers that surges up from the depths of the earth with tremendous pressure. There are two new geysers, one near the soccer field. A rustic spa has been built near the geyser with services for people who are seeking the healing powers of sulphurous waters found here.

References

External links
Geyser (image)

Populated places in Michoacán